"Heart Attack" is a song by American singer Trey Songz. It was produced by Benny Blanco and Rico Love and released as the lead single from Trey Songz's fifth studio album, Chapter V on March 26, 2012. It reached the top 40 in the United Kingdom, peaking at number 28 on the UK Singles Chart and peaked at number 35 in the United States on the US Billboard Hot 100. "Heart Attack" received a nomination for Best R&B Song at the 2013 Grammy Awards.

Music video
The video was filmed on April 7, 2012. It was directed by Benny Boom. The video was released on May 4, 2012. Kelly Rowland plays Songz' love interest in the video.

Charts

Weekly charts

Year-end charts

Certifications

References

2012 songs
2012 singles
Trey Songz songs
Atlantic Records singles
Music videos directed by Benny Boom
Songs written by Benny Blanco
Songs written by Trey Songz
Songs written by Rico Love